Bette Midler Sings the Rosemary Clooney Songbook is an album by the American singer Bette Midler. It was produced by Barry Manilow and marked the first time that Midler had worked with Manilow in more than twenty years. It was also Midler's first album for Columbia Records after nearly 30 years recording for Warner Music Group (being signed at times to both Atlantic Records and Warner Bros. Records). Columbia Records is owned by Sony Music Entertainment.

After the death of singer Rosemary Clooney in the summer of 2002, Manilow claims to have had a dream that he would produce a tribute album and Midler would be the singer on the album. In the liner notes, Midler writes, "When Barry approached me ("I had this dream!") about recording an album of Rosemary's standards, I was excited, but apprehensive. I wanted to be respectful, but I felt we had to find something new to say as well, and in these (mostly) new arrangements...I believe we have."

Bette Midler Sings the Rosemary Clooney Songbook was Midler's first album with Columbia Records after being dropped by Warner Bros. in 2001 for declining record sales. The album peaked at #14 on The Billboard 200 with 71,000 copies sold in its initial week of release, and been certified Gold by the RIAA. (As of August 2005, the album had sold 721,000 copies in the United States, according to Nielsen SoundScan). It was followed up with Bette Midler Sings the Peggy Lee Songbook, which was somewhat less successful.

Critical reception

AllMusic editor Matt Collar rated the album four stars out of five. He fpund that "Midler's plucky blonde persona and genre-crossing style and Manilow's modern day blend of Mercer and Porter make this album work – most of the time [...] Midler – who can carry a tune on personality alone – sounds elegant and alive here and Manilow's classy orchestral arrangements frame the proceedings with the urbane glow of nostalgia for a time – be it the '50s or the '70s – when a big band, a great song, and blonde with a nice voice were all you needed for a good time."

Track listing 
 "You'll Never Know" (Mack Gordon, Harry Warren) – 1:44 
 "This Ole House"  (Stuart Hamblen) – 3:02 
 "On a Slow Boat to China" (Frank Loesser) – 2:31 – Duet With Barry Manilow
 "Hey There" (Richard Adler, Jerry Ross) – 3:30 
 "Tenderly" (Walter Lloyd Gross, Jack Lawrence) – 3:11 
 "Come On-a My House" (Ross Bagdasarian, Sr., William Saroyan) – 1:50 
 "Mambo Italiano" (Bob Merrill) – 2:50  
 "Sisters" (Irving Berlin) – 2:53 – Duet with Linda Ronstadt
 "Memories of You" (Eubie Blake, Andy Razaf) – 3:20 
 "In the Cool, Cool, Cool of the Evening" (Hoagy Carmichael, Johnny Mercer) – 2:44 
 "White Christmas"  (Irving Berlin) – 3:16

Personnel

Chuck Berghofer – bass
Kenny Blackwell – mandolin 
Robbie Buchanan – piano
Jorge Calandrelli – conductor
Vinnie Colaiuta – drums
George Doering – guitar 
Ray Ellis – conductor
Gregg Field – drums
Barry Manilow – piano
Bette Midler – vocals

Dean Parks – guitar
Herb Pedersen – banjo
Hans Stamer – background vocals
Warren Stanyer – background vocals
Beverly Staunton – background vocals
David Steele – background vocals
Michael Thompson – guitar 
Randy Waldman – piano
Steve Welsh – piano
Patrick Williams – conductor

Charts

Certifications

References 

2003 albums
Bette Midler albums
Columbia Records albums
Tribute albums